Sue McKenzie (born 29 October 1950) is an Australian former swimmer. She competed in two events at the 1968 Summer Olympics.

References

External links
 

1950 births
Living people
Australian female breaststroke swimmers
Olympic swimmers of Australia
Swimmers at the 1968 Summer Olympics
Swimmers from Melbourne
20th-century Australian women
21st-century Australian women